Donnalee Roberts, sometimes as DonnaLee Roberts, (born 28 August 1984) is a South African actress, model, filmmaker and screenwriter. She is best known for the roles in the films Stroomop, Road to your Heart and Vir Altyd.

Personal life
In 2006, she graduated from University of Pretoria with a BA degree in drama. Then she completed two-year course at Performing Arts and Lifestyle Institute (PALI) from 2007 to 2008. In 2012, she joined New York Film Academy and completed a diploma in Acting for Film. In 2017, she participated to the International Script Writing in Robert Mckee's Script Writing Seminar, London.

In 2010, she married the businessman Gerber, but later divorced in November 2013. Then she married Ivan Botha where the wedding was celebrated on 17 May 2019. The couple have one son, Cameron, who was born in March 2020.

Career
In 2013, she made film debut with Klein Karoo by playing the role "Cybil Ferreira". The film received critics acclaim and Roberts was nominated for the SAFTA Golden Horn for Best Actress in Feature Film category at the South African Film and Television Awards (SAFTA).

After that success, she made three more successful films in the following years: Ek Joke Net 2, Ballade vir 'n Enkeling and Vir Altyd. In 2018, she wrote and acted in the film Stroomop. In 2019 at the Female Filmmakers Festival Berlin, she was nominated for the Jury Prize for Best Screenplay. In 2021, she acted and co-produced the film Beurtkrag.

Apart from cinema, she also appeared in the SABC2 soap opera 7de Laan, where she played the role "Annelie van Dyk". Meanwhile, she also appeared in the Kyknet soapie Egoli with the role "Laeticia".

Filmography

References

External links

1984 births
Living people
South African film actresses